Notre Dame High School is a private, Roman Catholic high school in Burlington, Iowa.  It is located in the Roman Catholic Diocese of Davenport.

Background
Notre Dame opened in 1957. 
Current High School Principal is Mr. Bill Maupin.
Past two principals were Dave Edwards and Ron Glasgow   
It is located at 702 S. Roosevelt Burlington, IA.

Athletics
The Nikes compete in the Southeast Iowa Superconference. Notre Dame is a member of the Iowa High School Athletic Association.  They have won the following IHSAA State Championships:

 Boys Baseball - 1982 Class 2A 
 Boys Golf - 1983 Class 2A
 Girls Basketball - 2014 Class 1A

The school has a sharing agreement for sports with the Independent School District of West Burlington. Notre Dame also shares soccer with both the Independent School District of West Burlington and Danville High School. Burlington Community School District hosts swimming.

Sports hosted by Burlington Notre Dame

 Boys and Girls Golf
 Boys and Girls Cross Country
 Boys Baseball
 Boys and Girls Wrestling
 Boys Soccer
Sports hosted by the Independent School District of West Burlington

 Boys Football
 Boys and Girls Track and Field
 Girls Softball
 Boys and Girls Tennis
 Boys and Girls Trap Shooting

Fine arts
Boys and Girls Choir
Boys and Girls Band
Boys and Girls Jazz Band
Boys and Girls Jazz Choir

See also
St. Paul's Catholic Church (Burlington, Iowa)
Church of St. John the Baptist (Burlington, Iowa)
List of high schools in Iowa

Notes and references

External links
 School Website

Schools in Des Moines County, Iowa
Educational institutions established in 1957
Roman Catholic Diocese of Davenport
Catholic secondary schools in Iowa
Private high schools in Iowa
Buildings and structures in Burlington, Iowa
1957 establishments in Iowa